Communist holocaust may refer to:

 Double genocide theory
 Holocaust trivialization
 Holocaust victims#Leftists
 Holodomor
 Mass killings under communist regimes

See also
 Red Holocaust (disambiguation)